The men's 100 metres was a track and field athletics event held as part of the Athletics at the 1912 Summer Olympics programme.  It was the fifth appearance of the event, which is one of 12 athletics events to have been held at every Summer Olympics. The competition was held on 6 July 1912 and on 7 July 1912. Seventy runners from 22 nations competed. NOCs could enter up to 12 athletes. The event was won by Ralph Craig of the United States, as the Americans swept the medals for a second time (previously having done so in 1904).

Background

This was the fifth time the event was held, having appeared at every Olympics since the first in 1896. None of the 1908 medalists returned in 1912. Notable entrants included Erwin Kern, Emil Ketterer, and Richard Rau of Germany, who shared the unofficial world record; George Patching of South Africa, the 1910 and 1911 AAA Championships winner; and United States Olympic Trials winners Ira Courtney, Clement Wilson, and Howard Drew.

Chile (disputed, as Luis Subercaseaux may have run in 1896), Iceland, Japan, Portugal, Russia, and Serbia were represented in the event for the first time.  "Australasia" also appeared for the first time, though Australia had previously competed. The United States and Hungary were the only two nations to have appeared at each of the first five Olympic men's 100 metres events.

Competition format

The event maintained the three round format from 1908: heats, semifinals, and a final. This time, however, the top two runners in each of the 17 heats advanced to the semifinals. These 34 semifinalists (which became 33, as the first heat had only 1 runner) were divided into 6 semifinal heats; only the top runner in each semifinal advanced to the final.

Records

These were the standing world and Olympic records (in seconds) prior to the 1912 Summer Olympics.

(*) unofficial

(**) Actual time was 10.7, rounded up to the nearest fifth, in accordance with rules in force at the time. So his time was only given as 10.

The Olympic record for the 100 metres coming into 1912 was 10.8 seconds.  It was matched by David Jacobs of Great Britain in the 10th heat before being broken by American Donald Lippincott with 10.6 seconds in the 16th heat. This was also the inaugural official world record in the 100 metres. Three semifinalists (including Lippincott) ran the race in 10.7 seconds, but the new record of 10.6 seconds stood for the rest of the event.

Results

Heats

All heats were held on Saturday, July 6, 1912.

Heat 1

Heat 2

Möller and Szalay were close at 70 metres; "Möller was stronger in the finish, however, and won by something more than half a metre."

Heat 3

There was much separation at the top of this heat; Courtney "won without being extended" and Jankovich "was a very easy second."

Heat 4

With both runners assured of advancement to the semifinals, they "ran the course very quietly" with Rice "breaking the tape easily ahead of" Smedmark.

Heat 5

This was a close race between the top two placers, with d'Arcy "shak[ing] off" Povey at the end and winning "by a metre."

Heat 6

Rau started strongly and led throughout.

Heat 7

In one of the faster heats, Stewart finished "well in front of [Aelter], who also ran very well."

Heat 8

Lindberg won the heat "easily."

Heat 9

Meyer "won without any apparent effort," as Giongo "ran well, although he was not the same class as the American."

Heat 10

Jacobs matched the Olympic record in a tight heat, neck-and-neck with Wilson for most of the way before winning by "a hands-breadth."

Heat 11

Belote was "a safe winner, after a very quick finish."

Heat 12

Weinzinger had a good start and led at 25 metres before falling to third. Gerhard "was clearly the best man."

Heat 13

Patching had a false start. The top three men were close, with Patching leading at 85 metres but Howard taking the lead at the end by "the least bit."

Heat 14

McConnell led early but faltered at the end; Thomas passed him for the second qualifying spot "just before reaching the post."

Heat 15

There was a false start. Drew "won easily" with Kern "a pretty good distance behind."

Heat 16

There were two false starts in this heat before, on the third try, Lippincott set a new Olympic record and the first official world record. He "led from start to finish, and gave the impression that he would be an easy winner, but Applegarth came on very quickly in the last 20 metres, and Lippincott had to do his very best in order to keep the lead."

Heat 17

Ekberg started well and led through halfway before being passed by Craig and Szobota at around 60 metres. Craig then "won easily" over Szobota.

Semifinals

All semi-finals were held on Saturday, July 6, 1912.

Semifinal 1

Drew "ran magnificently" and used a "powerful, concentrated finish" to become "a safe winner."

Semifinal 2

Patching had another false start in this round. Lindberg fell behind early, dropping to fourth place at the halfway mark, but challenged Patching with a "hard spurt" at the end. The distance between the two was too much for him to make up, however.

Semifinal 3

In an event marred by false starts, this semifinal heat was decided by a legal start that one runner thought false. Smedmark was off first, but came to a stop thinking he had false started. The remaining runners saw a "hard struggle between Meyer and Jacobs" with Meyer "strongest in the last 10 metres" to win.

Semifinal 4

This semifinal heat featured 9 false starts. Rau led for the first 70 metres before being caught by Craig, who "won by more than a metre."

Semifinal 5

This heat had a "sharp struggle for the lead during the whole of the race."

Semifinal 6

Belote led throughout.

Final

The final was held on Sunday, July 7, 1912. Drew was forced to scratch from the final after he pulled a tendon at the end of the first semi-final. 

The final featured eight false starts, one of which saw Craig and Lippincott fail to hear the recall gun and run to the finish line. On the ninth attempt, Patching had the strongest start and led at 40 metres by half a metre. 

Craig caught Patching at 60 metres. At the 75-metre mark, Craig was "a hand's-breadth" ahead of Patching and Meyer, with Lippincott and Belote another half-metre back. At the end, "Craig ran brilliantly and with enormous power." Meyer separated from Patching, who stayed in the third spot until "the last few strides" before being passed "almost on the very line" by Lippincott.

The official report gives the result as Ralph Craig 10, Alvah Meyer 60 cm behind winner, and Donald Lippincott 15 cm behind second man.

References

External links
 
 

Men's 0100 metres
100 metres at the Olympics